Tortuguero Protected Zone, is a protected area in Costa Rica, managed under the Tortuguero Conservation Area, it was created in 1990 by executive decree 19971-MIRENEM. It is located next to Tortuguero National Park.

References 

Nature reserves in Costa Rica
Protected areas established in 1990